Anthology 3: Rarities is a greatest hits compilation album of mainly covers (including Paul McCartney, ZZ Top and Led Zeppelin), by Australian singer John Farnham. The album was released in Australia on 10 November 1997, and is the third of a three disc Anthology set. The album featured a swing version of "You're the Voice" with the Melbourne Symphony Orchestra that had been taped live at the Grand Opening of Crown Casino, plus one duet each with Australian country vocalist and icon Smoky Dawson, and Taiwanese singer Chiu.

Track listing
 "I Feel Fine" (J. Lennon, P. McCartney) – 2:06
 "Susan Jones" (P. Best) – 2:00
 "Birthday" (J. Lennon, P. McCartney) – 2:50
 "Legs [Live]" (F. Beard, J. HIll, B. Gibbons) – 4:38
 "Black Dog" (J. Page, R. Plant, J. Jones) – 4:37
 "Dream People" (F. Howson, J. Capek) – 5:05
 "Good Company" (R. Fraser, P. Buckle, J. Farnham) – 4:23
 "Take You Back" (S. Romig, F. Sablotny) – 4:06
 "Love's in Need" (S. Wonder) – 4:04
 "You're the Voice [Swing Version]" (A. Qunta, C. Thompson, K. Reid, M. Ryder) – 4:57
 "Little Piece of My Heart" (C. Celli, A. Levin, J. Ponti) – 2:10
 "Break The Ice" (S. Schifrin, B. Marlette) – 3:19
 "Running For Love" (H. Faltermeyer, T. Whitlock) – 2:56
 "Burn For You [U.S. Mix]" (P. Buckle, R. Fraser, J. Farnham) – 3:28
 "Cool Water" (B. Nolan) – 3:54
 "Don't Let It End" (A. Hendra) – 4:42

Charts

Weekly charts

Year-end charts

Certifications

References 

John Farnham compilation albums
1997 compilation albums